Callistoplacidae is a family of chitons belonging to the order Chitonida.

Genera
The following genera are recognised in the family Callistoplacidae:
 Callistochiton Carpenter
 Callistoplax Carpenter
 Calloplax Thiele, 1909
 Caribbochiton Sirenko & B. Anseeuw, 2021
 Ceratozona Dall, 1882
 Ischnoplax Dall, 1879

References

Chitons